Tall Munbāqa or Mumbaqat, the site of the Late Bronze Age city of Ekalte, is a 5,000-year-old town complex in northern Syria now lying in ruins. The ruins are located on a steep slope on the east bank of the upper course of the Euphrates. In the 3rd and 2nd millennium BC the city was an important city-state in the region. Due to the establishment of the Tabqa Dam at Al-Thawrah, 35 kilometers west of Raqqa, the city ruins are partially flooded today by Lake Assad. Situated high above the steep drop of the eastern shore, Tall Munbāqa is still preserved. The Bronze Age site of Tell Hadidi (Azu) lies 5 kilometers to the north.

History
The Euphrates was one of the highways, Asia with the Mediterranean combined. Of course one of the main trade routes between the Sumerian and later Babylonian centers of power and the Syrian coastal cities and the immediate access to the main navigable river can be considered as one of the basic motives for founding this city. Trade was driving to urban planning. Town authorities and city destruction characterize the Urbanisationsfieber of the 3rd and 2nd millennium BC in northern Syria, where the river from the Armenian highlands turns to the south-east, 200  km from the nearby Mediterranean were major trading centers. From there, the road passes over the northern Syrian plateau of Aleppo. Starting from the 4th millennium BC, Sumerian trading sites are detectable here. In the 3rd millennium, the height of the cultural and economic development, according to the model developed chiefdom Sumerian cities. The Old Syrian kingdom reached the 2nd millennium BC to the Euphrates. The Mitannistaat the Hurrians dominated a few centuries out the northeast of modern-day Syria to the Euphrates. In the 14th century, BC ruled the Hittites northern Syria and the Euphrates was the boundary area between the Assyrian and Hittite Empire. Around 1200 BC settled the Syrians on the Euphrates. This eventful history may be seen from the numerous ruins of hills along the 90  km long reservoir. One of the largest excavated ruins of this ancient cultural landscape is Tall Munbāqa.

Archaeology
In 1907, the English explorers William M. Ramsay and Gertrude Bell discovered the ruins, drew up a plan and described the ramparts: "Munbayah where my tents were pitched - the Arabic name means only a high-altitude course - was probably the Bersiba in Ptolemy's list of city names. It consists of a double ramparts, situated on the river bank." Though Bell was wrong in the localization of Bersiba, she did recognize the importance of the mound for the study of the oriental city. 

The 400 m x 500 m, rectangular town ruins, once strongly fortified, were documented and investigated 1964, on the occasion of the inspection of the area for a proposed reservoir. The German Oriental Society requested an excavation permit for the mound in 1968. In 1969-1970, Ernst Heinrich of the Berlin Institute of Technology measured the visible remains and in 1971 the excavation of these remains were carried out. In 1973 and 1974, excavations were led by Winfried Orthmann and in 1977 by Alfred Werner Maurer, both of the University of Saarbrücken. From 1979 on Dittmar Machule of the Technical University of Hamburg-Harburg was the director. During the excavations in 1973, 1974 and 1977 up to 16 scientists and 90 local workers were involved in the excavations. Thanks to the discovery of 15 Late Bronze Age clay tablets mentioning the name of the city, it is now believed that it was known in this period as Ekalte and it has been suggested that earlier, in the Old Babylonian period, the city bore the name Yakaltum.

Excavation was resumed in 1999 and continued in six seasons until 2010 under Machule and Felix Blocher.

City gates
The 1974 excavation exposed two city gates. The East Gate is located on ♁ 36° 13' 9" N, 38° 7' 54"  O36.219159 38.131635, the south gate on ♁ 36° 13' 1" N, 38° 7' 44"  O36.217047 38.12891.

References

Further reading
Winfried Orthmann: Der Alte Orient. Propyläen Kunstgeschichte, Bd. 14 (1974), 475;
W. Mayer: Tall Munbaqa - Ekalte II. Die Texte. DOG 102, Saarbrücken 2001;
Boese, W. Orthmann: Mumbaqat. Eine 5000 Jahre alte Stadt am Euphrat. Saarbrücken 1976;
P. Werner: Tall Munbaqa - Bronzezeit in Syrien. Katalog zur Wanderausstellung, Neumünster 1998; 
E. Kretz: Ein Töpferofen mit Lochtenne und Kuppel in Mumbaqat. In: Festschrift für Martin Graßnick, ed. Fachbereich Architektur / Raum- und Umweltplanung / Bauingenieurwesen der Universität Kaiserslautern, 1987, 267–270;
Alfred Werner Maurer: Mumbaqat 1977, Bericht über die von der Deutschen Orient-Gesellschaft mit Mitteln der Universität Saarbrücken unternommene Ausgrabung. Philologus Verlag, Basel 2007.
Eduardo Torrecilla, Late Bronze Age Ekalte - Chronology, Society, and Religion of a Middle Euphrates Town, Noor Publishing, 2014,

External links
 Links to annual excavation reports from Mumbaqat (Deutsch)
 Links to pottery kiln from Mumbaqat (Deutsch)

See also
Cities of the ancient Near East

Archaeological sites in Aleppo Governorate
Former populated places in Syria
Former populated places in Southwest Asia
Archaeological type sites